The R. Premadasa International Cricket Stadium (RPS) (also known as Khettarama Stadium, Ranasinghe Premadasa Stadium or simply as the Premadasa Stadium) is a cricket stadium on Khettarama Road, Maligawatta, Colombo, Sri Lanka. The stadium was, before June 1994, known as the Khettarama Cricket Stadium and is today one of the main venues where the Sri Lankan cricket team play, having hosted more than 100 one day international matches. It is the largest stadium in Sri Lanka with a capacity of 35,000 spectators. It has hosted the 2012 ICC World Twenty20 final between Sri Lanka and West Indies; the 2002 ICC Champions Trophy final between Sri Lanka and India and first semi final of the 2011 ICC Cricket World Cup between Sri Lanka and New Zealand. This was where the highest Test score in the history was recorded; 952 by Sri Lanka against India. With capacity exceeding Lord's in England, the stadium is known as the "home of Sri Lankan cricket".

History

Early history
The stadium is the brainchild of the late Sri Lankan president Ranasinghe Premadasa, who championed the development of this 40,000-seater concrete bowl, the biggest stadium in Sri Lanka. Opened on 2 February 1986 with a match between a Sri Lanka 'B' side and an England 'B' team, the stadium was built on swampland previously used by monks ferrying across to the Khettarama temple adjacent to it.

Ground history
The inaugural One Day International was played on 9 March 1986, Sri Lanka v Pakistan. On 28 August 1992 it hosted its inaugural Test match between Sri Lanka and Australia. The venue is best remembered for holding the world record for the highest Test total – 952/6 declared by Sri Lanka against India in 1997/1998 in which former Sri Lanka captain Sanath Jayasuriya scored 340 and Roshan Mahanama 225, the pair sharing a partnership 576 for the second wicket, at that time it was the highest for any wicket in a Test Match. On 10 February 2009 it hosted inaugural T20i match between Sri Lanka & India as well as 1st T20i to be played in Sri Lanka.

A new training center has been developed behind the stadium with 16 practice pitches and dormitories for the Sony Max Cricket Academy which started in 2003.

Renovation
The Premadasa Stadium underwent a reconstruction project in preparation for the 2011 Cricket World Cup. The stadium has been undergoing large-scale renovations since 2009. It has had its seating capacity increase from 14,000 to 40,000, the media-box accommodating 200 journalists, and other upgrades. The renovations have cost Sri Lanka Cricket $8 million.

In July 2010, a report filed by the ICC pitch consultant, Andy Atkinson, raised concerns over the condition of the outfield and the pitch claiming he was worried at the slow pace of progress. Although none of the buildings at the stadium were near completion, the 2nd Test of the West Indies tour of Sri Lanka in 2010, was held at the venue in 23–27 November. Sri Lanka Cricket defended choosing the stadium saying that the decision to stage a game was to allow cricketers to acclimatize themselves to the ground ahead of the World Cup games. The Test match was staged using temporary seating for spectators in a corner of the stadium as only players' pavilions had permanent arrangements. Since the press box was not completed reporters and commentators facing technical difficulties used a makeshift arrangement.

The main four public stands were refurbished along with the player dressing room area and the corporate boxes. A VIP car park is in the northern end of the ground.

Stadium plan 

Pavilions A and B are fully equipped with seating in two tiers, lower and higher. Several corporate boxes are built in these two stands. Pavilions C and D are built between the scoreboard in the stadium with a two-tiered seating system. The lower tiers have concrete paving allocated for floor seating and the upper tier includes fully standard seating blocks. The grandstand and top level block above the player pavilions have enhanced quality seating. Pavilions A and B give a moderate view of the scoreboard while the grandstand not only gives good view of the scoreboard but also the game and pitch

After renovation
The R Premadasa Stadium hosted seven successful World Cup matches including a quarter-final and a semi-final. On 10 May 2011 Sri Lanka Cricket secretary Nishantha Ranatunga confirmed that first edition of 2011 Sri Lanka Premier League's matches would play at R Premadasa Stadium. The tournament was later postponed till 2012 due to financial complications and internal regime change at Sri Lanka Cricket.

On 21 September 2011, it was announced that the stadium will host fifteen 2012 ICC World Twenty20 matches, including semi-finals and the final.

Ground figures

International Matches

Key

 P Matches Played
 H Matches Won by Home Side
 T Matches Won by Touring Side
 N Matches Won by Neutral Side
D/N/T Matches Drawn/No Result/Tied

Test cricket
The highest Test total of all time was recorded at the R Premadasa Stadium is 952/6 declared by Sri Lanka against India in 1997.
The lowest Test total is 87 by Bangladesh against Sri Lanka in 2005.
Sanath Jayasuriya scored 340 against India in 1997. This remains the highest score at R Premadasa stadium.
 The 36 wickets captured by Muttiah Muralitharan remains the most number of wickets at the R Premadasa stadium.
 The best bowling figures in an innings is 7/89 by Rangana Herath against Bangladesh in the 2012/13 season.
 Muttiah Muralitharan's 9/60 remains the best bowling figures in a match.

One Day Internationals
The highest ODI total is 375/5 by India against Sri Lanka on 31 August 2017.
Sanath Jayasuriya has scored 2514 runs and is the highest by a single player at the Premadasa stadium and he held the record for being the highest runs scored in a single cricket ground till January 2018 before Tamim Iqbal take over it. Marvan Atapattu, Aravinda de Silva, Mahela Jayawardene, Kumar Sangakkara and Sachin Tendulkar has scored more than 1000 runs.
Muttiah Muralitharan with 75 scalps has captured the most number of wickets at the Premadasa stadium.
The highest individual score at R Premadasa stadium is 169 by Kumar Sangakkara against South Africa in the 2013 season.
R Premedasa stadium became the first in Sri Lanka and fourth in the world to reach 100 ODIs hosted stadium.
Lasith Malinga has taken two ODI hat-tricks at this stadium. The first came against Kenya in the 2011 World Cup and the second versus Australia on 22 August 2011

Twenty20 Internationals
First match played on 10 February 2009 involving Sri Lanka and India
Highest team total at the R Premadasa Stadium is 215/5 by Bangladesh against Sri Lanka.
The lowest total is 80 by Afghanistan against England on 21 September 2012.
Sri Lanka has lost 9 of 10 match played in this ground, which is the worst home ground for Sri Lanka.
Sri Lanka won the t20i series against india in first time at this ground in 2021

World Cup Cricket

In 1996 and 2011 ICC cricket world cups R. Premadasa Stadium hosted nine matches including a quarter-final match and a semi-final match. It has hosted the highest number of cricket world cup matches in Sri Lanka.

1996 Cricket World Cup

2011 Cricket World Cup

Group matches

Quarter-finals

Semi-finals

ICC Champions Trophy Cricket
The 2002 ICC Champions Trophy was held in Sri Lanka. Nine matches were played in R. Premadasa Stadium including semi-finals and the final. Other matches were played in SSC.

2002 ICC Champions Trophy

 
Group matches

Semi-finals

Final

ICC World Twenty20
Sri Lanka hosted the 2012 ICC World Twenty20. Fifteen out of twenty-seven matches were played at R. Premadasa stadium, including semi-finals and the final. Other matches were played in Pallekele International Cricket Stadium and Mahinda Rajapaksa International Stadium.

2012 ICC World Twenty20

Group matches

Super 8s

Semi-finals

Final

Gallery

See also

 List of stadiums by capacity
 List of Test cricket grounds
 List of international cricket grounds in Sri Lanka

References

External links

 Cricinfo profile on R. Premadasa Stadium

Cricket grounds in Colombo
Test cricket grounds in Sri Lanka
1986 establishments in Sri Lanka
1996 Cricket World Cup stadiums
2011 Cricket World Cup stadiums